Women's Australian rules football (in areas where it is popular, known simply as women's football or women's footy or women's AFL), is the female-only form of Australian rules football, generally with some modification to the laws of the game.

The first Australian rules football matches involving women were organised late in the 19th century, but for several decades it occurred mostly in the form of scratch matches, charity matches and one-off exhibition games. The first all-female matches began early in the 20th century, and regular competition first emerged after World War II.

State-based leagues emerged between the 1980s and 2000s: the first was the Victorian Women's Football League (VWFL) formed in Melbourne in 1981, with others including the West Australian Women's Football League (WAWFL) formed in Perth in 1988 and the South Australian Women's Football League (SAWFL) formed in Adelaide in 1991. The AFL Women's National Championships were inaugurated in 1992.

Women's football was professionalised in the 2010s with the establishment of a national league, AFL Women's, that commenced its inaugural season in 2017, with eight teams formed by existing Australian Football League (AFL) clubs: all 18 AFL clubs have fielded women's teams in Season 7 (the second season of 2022).

Women's Australian rules football is the most played and watched code of all-women's football in Australia: with more than half a million players, it has surpassed all other football codes in players, including soccer which was once far more popular.

The highest level of semi-professional competition, the AFLW, attracts a large audience of more than one million attendees and over two million viewers, and has managed to maintain its high levels of interest despite moving to primarily ticketed and subscription broadcasting models in 2021.

The AFLW competition is the most attended women's football competition in Australia, and one of the most popular women's football competitions in the world. With an average attendance in 2019 of 6,262 a game, it has the second highest of any domestic women's football competition. Its record Grand Final attendance of 53,034 for the 2019 AFL Women's Grand Final is also the current record for Women's Australian rules football.

Women's Australian rules has also grown rapidly outside of Australia since the 2000s: the Women's International Cup has been run since 2011, and players from around the world have made it to the highest level of the sport, including Laura Duryea, Clara Fitzpatrick and Cora Staunton (Ireland), Brooke Walker (New Zealand), Danielle Marshall (USA), and Kendra Heil (Canada).

History

The game's governing body, the AFL Commission, has been criticised for its lack of acknowledgement of the history of women's football, taking credit only for the virtually overnight "revolution" of the AFLW while making only passing reference to its origins and development.

While the Australian Football League has, in fact, played some role in the development of women's football in Australia, especially from the 2010s, it operated for 120 years without any official female teams, and was one of the last sporting competitions in the country to affiliate with a women's league. Overall public support for women's football in the league's home of Melbourne has also lagged behind the rest of the country to an extent.
 
Codified in 1859, Australian football had been played by men for almost half a century before the first all-women's football matches were played: exceptions to this included charity matches, such as patriotic fundraisers, which occasionally featured women players. Despite this, women have nonetheless followed the Australian game passionately since the mid-19th century, accounting for approximately 50% of spectators at matches, a uniquely high figure among football codes. As early as 1862 women publicly questioned why they would not be able to play.

Women's soccer became popular in the 1920s, and while documented mentions of football matches are often difficult to differentiate as to whether they were played under Australian rules, there is significant evidence of a continuity in competition from the end of World War I spanning several Australian states.

Both world wars were a great liberator for women; as the men fought in the war, women were often called to perform many tasks typically done by men, including spectator sports.

Earliest women's teams and matches
In August 1880, a group gathered at Sandhurst (Bendigo) in Victoria responding to a postcard from signed "Lover of Football" to form an all-ladies football club. The idea was considered a novelty at the time, and did not proceed, though generated some attention across regional Victoria. In 1886, a local paper reported that a group of women in Williamstown were seen playing kick-to-kick. In the same year a call for a ladies football club affiliated with the North Williamstown Football Club suggesting a hybrid match against a women's lacrosse club was made in the Williamstown Chronicle.

Costume football matches were popular from the late 1870s as a form of outdoor fancy dress theatre amusement mixing opera, comedy and pantomime. While early events were poorly documented, accounts from the time were over the top and gaudy affairs. However such matches provided a gateway for female participation and over time these there were more and more documented accounts of the inclusion of female characters. In 1887 one of the earliest accounts of numerous "young ladies" participating was held in Ballarat, at the Eastern Oval in front of a huge crowd of 6,000.

In 1892, a Bendigo woman was charged with nuisance for kicking a football in the street.

In 1894, a high profile costume match was played to raise funds for the Australian Dramatic and Musical Association which featured one of the earliest all-female teams which included Nellie Stewart, Florence Maude Young, Jennie Lee, Violet Varley and Flora Graupner. Played at the East Melbourne Cricket Ground the match attracted one of the largest crowds ever seen to the ground and was declared a draw and the media lauded the performance of the female team: "the ladies, in fact, carried all before them". A repeat female vs male match was played at the Theatrical Carnival at the Royal Exhibition Building in 1895.

Records exist of a football side in Perth, Western Australia made up of department store staff playing as Foy & Gibson's as early as 1915. Some of the first organised matches were played on Perth Oval, including one on 14 October 1917.

In September 1918 matches were played across Australia. In South Australia, North took on South at the Jubilee Oval in Adelaide on the 21st. In Victoria the Federal Khaki Clothing Factory "Khaki girls" team (playing in khaki and white) travelled to Ballarat to play the Ballarat Eleanor Lucas's lingerie factory "Lucas girls" team (playing in pink and white and coached by Charlie Clymo) at City Oval in Ballarat, Victoria in August which was, according to reports, a highly physical contest in front of a "huge crowd" and the even was met with substantial fanfare. The match funded the Ballarat Arch of Victory. The Lucas girls won the match 3 goals 6 (24) to the Khakis 1 goal 2 (8) in front of 7,000 people, then the largest football crowd in Ballarat history. A photograph of the Lucas Girls Football team appears in the Ballarat Star in December 1918.

There are photographs from a match played in Perth, Western Australia, though only the year (1918) is known, however these matches were played on and off through the 1910s and 20s and were known as the Shopgirl's competition.

In South Australia, an early example of Women's football was a Port Adelaide Women's team in November, 1918 where a game took place at Alberton Oval between Port Adelaide and another club representing Thebarton. Port Adelaide was captained by Eileen Rend.

Interwar era: Female football challenges stereotypes
Women's teams were formed at Riverton, South Australia, to play scratch matches in 1920.

The first match to be played in Melbourne was in 1921. According to the AFL Record, following World War I, a match in Melbourne was held to show that women could play what had previously been seen to be a man's sport. The first women's match attracted a large crowd and interest. The umpire wore a skirt. In 1921, a women's team in St Kilda organised a game with the women wearing kits donated by the St Kilda men's club and shorts rather than dresses. A team regularly practiced on Saturday mornings at the St Kilda Cricket Ground.

In 1922, a Fitzroy female team travelled to Perth and played West Perth in front of 13,500 spectators.

The 1923 Richmond ladies football team played against the men's side in Melbourne to raise funds for a junior trip.

In 1929, as part of an annual charity day, a 30-minute match was played on Adelaide Oval between workers of the Charles Moore & Co. factory and the Mirror Shirt and Pyjama Factory. Although the match was not a standalone event, newspapers at the time did refer to it as the main attraction of the day. A moth biplane dropped the game ball to start the match. In 1930, the club captain and secretary Veronica O'Callahan announced that the Charles Moore's club was going into recess, claiming that the game is "too rough" to become popular with girls in Adelaide. Nevertheless, Port Adelaide Magpies reformed a women's team for the following year to play against a team from Queenstown. In August 1930, a charity match was organised in Perth on what is now the WACA Ground.

In 1931, women protested against all-female matches being organised for Melbourne. That year, Oakleigh and Carnegie Football girls' clubs staged a match in front of a large crowd at Caulfield Racecourse in Melbourne.

In 1933, a match played between Carlton and Richmond women's teams at Princes Park stadium in Melbourne was incorrectly billed on Sydney company Cinesound Newsreel as the "first women's rugby match"; the teams were composed mostly of female netball and track-and-field athletes eager to try Australian rules.

Post World War II: Expansion and regular competition

Women's football was being increasingly organised in northern Tasmania in the 1940s with the formation of several dedicated clubs and matches in Launceston.

Archives also show a charity women's match occurred on Bassendean Oval in Perth, Western Australia, 27 August 1944. It is unknown whether the game had been played continuously in the state.
 Another match in 1944 was held in June at Memorial Oval Port Pirie, South Australia.

Calls were made for big VFL clubs, including reigning premiers Essendon, to field women's sides in 1947. That year a round-robin competition was held at Glenferrie Oval featuring VFL clubs, with South Melbourne, Footscray, Hawthorn and St Kilda competing in an all-female competition. The league competed through the 1950s and was actively promoted by Footscray VFL champions "Mr Football" Ted Whitten and Jack Collins.

Regular girls football was also being played in North West Tasmania, with clubs in Ulverstone and Devonport playing in 1946. Tasmanian Football League clubs Launceston and Clarence added women's teams to the competition in 1947. Matches were also being played in the Wimmera-Mallee region of Victoria in towns such as Hopetoun, Lascelles and Camperdown.

By 1947, the Adelaide women's competition had grown to seven teams.

In 1953, a South Fremantle women's side took on and defeated Boans Limited at Perth Oval.

In 1954, girls' football matches were held at Cobram.

In 1959, a Victorian squad composed of Footscray players was defeated by a Tasmanian team.

In 1967, a charity match was played in Regent's Park in London, between Aussie Girls and Wild Colonial Girls as a curtain raiser to a promotional men's match.

1980s: The modern leagues emerge
Beyond this and occasional matches over the years, women's football was rarely organised until the formation of the Victorian Women's Football League in 1981, with four teams competing at open level. With the West Australian Women's Football League's formation in 1988, followed by that of the South Australian Women's Football League in 1991, there were competitions in the three major states in the sport.

The first national junior championships for girls were established in 1992  with the advent of the first AFL Women's National Championship, while junior sides later took part in the first AFL Women's Under 18 Championships in 2008–2010.

Women's Australian rules football began to rapidly grow in 2000, with the number of registered teams increasing by a phenomenal 450%.

In 2006 the Australian Services and the ADF conducted a national development camps for female players to form a services league.

In 2007, the organisers of the E. J. Whitten Legends Game included, for the first time, female participants - Daisy Pearce and Shannon McFerran, both of the Victorian Women's Football League - enabling them to play against former men's AFL players. This significantly raised the profile of women's football in Victoria, with some of the former AFL players being outplayed by the female players. It became one of the few high-profile mixed-gender exhibition matches featuring high-profile women's players.

In women's Australian rules football in 2015, 163 new teams were formed, and a total of 284,501 players took part in organised games.

The first full international game was held between the USA Freedom and Team Canada in Vancouver on Saturday 4 August 2007 in front of a crowd of almost 2,500.

The 2019 AFLW Grand Final in Adelaide set the record for a stand-alone women's sports fixture in Australia and a new world record attendance for women's Australian rules football of 53,034 at the Adelaide Oval.

Rule modifications

Some women's competitions, but not all, are played with modified rules.

The main rule differences between women's and men's versions of Australian football involves modified tackling rules. Typically, aggressive slinging (swinging a player by the jumper or throwing the player to the ground) of opposition players in a tackle is not allowed. However, like the men's game, head-high contact is also not allowed.

Another main difference is the size of the ball: a slightly smaller ball to the men's version is often used to minimise hand injuries when marking the ball.

Games of International rules football are also played by many women's leagues against Gaelic Athletic Association clubs, and Recreational football, a fully non-contact version of Australian rules football, is also becoming popular amongst women in Australia and the United States. Many women's leagues also fall into the emerging 9-a-side footy or Metro footy formats.

Competitions

AFLW National league

A national competition backed by the AFL began in 2017. Bids for a licence to participate were submitted by 13 existing AFL teams, with eight teams awarded licences to participate in the inaugural season. All 18 AFL clubs have fielded an AFLW team since the second season of 2022.

While a licence had been granted to Fremantle under the umbrella of the Women's Football League in February 2010, due to this review and logistical issues surrounding the admission of the  Gold Coast and Greater Western Sydney to the AFL, this licence was recalled. After the announcement of the foundation of the AFLW in 2017, this licence was reissued to the club.

National Championships

Women's Football Australia were responsible for the annual AFL Women's National Championship, which ran from 1992 to 2015. After the 2015 edition, the AFL arranged the 2016 Exhibition Series and announced the formation of the AFLW in September 2016: with this, the raison d'etre for the Championship and Women's Football Australia ceased to exist, and they were dissolved.

In its history, eleven teams - two from Victoria (a senior team and an under-19s team), and single teams from the ACT, Northern Territory, New South Wales, South Australia, Western Australia, the Australian Defence Force, Queensland, Papua New Guinea and Tasmania - participated, with Victoria winning all of the championships (all but one by their senior team).

International competition

There was a women's division at the 2008 Australian Football International Cup with Australia, US, Canada and Papua New Guinea competing. There is also International Rules Football with a women's Australia women's international rules football team competing against the Ireland women's international rules football team. The 2006 tour helped to lift the profile of the sport slightly in Australia.

The first ever full international was held between the US "Freedom" and Team Canada in Vancouver on Saturday 4 August 2007. The US Freedom toured Australia in August 2009 playing teams in Sydney, Cairns, Bendigo, and Melbourne over an 8-day period.

Papua New Guinea's national team, the "Kurakums", competed in the AFL Women's National Championship before the Championship was dissolved in 2015.

Participation figures
The AFL's participation estimate for females is 530,166 participants worldwide in 2021.

During the 1970s, 1980s and 1990s, women's Australian rules football saw a large expansion in the number of competitors. In 1998, Auskick, a national program began. The program was designed to introduce the game to primary school aged children. By 2006, it had over 140,000 participants each year. Though the program was never specifically aimed at girls, the safe non-contact environment proved popular and in 2007 about 16% (12%) in of all Auskick participants were female.

In Australia, a total of 18,609 girls and women played Australian rules football in 2005 and in 2006 48,054 women played the sport in Australia, and it is one of the fastest growing sports among women in Australia.

By 2017, a record number of 463,364 females were playing Australian rules football across the nation, making up 30% of all participants. The number of female Australian Rules Football teams reached 1,690 nationally, a huge 76% increase on the previous year.

By region

Australia

There are women's Australian rules football teams in all states and territories of Australia.

Victoria

Organised women's Australian rules football has been played in Victoria since 1981 with the formation of the Victorian Women's Football League (VWFL), the oldest and largest Australian rules football league for women in the world.

Women's football in Victoria has a comparatively high profile in the media. The work done by League president Debbie Lee and Media Manager Leesa Catto as well as involvement by celebrities such as Tiffany Cherry have helped to boost exposure for the sport. The VWFL Grand Final is now played in front of a crowd exceeding 1,500 people. The annual Vic Country vs Vic Metro match has been now played as a curtain raiser to a home and away Australian Football League match at the Melbourne Cricket Ground. VWFL players have participated in charity matches against senior male players in both the AFL Legends Game (which is broadcast on television in multiple states and live in Victoria) and Community Cup.

The VWFL is an open age Women's Footy competition which began in 1981 with four teams. In the following decades it has grown substantially and now features 3 division structure and as well as many clubs fielding teams in the reserve grades for the first and second division. In 2004 the League affiliated with Football Victoria. In 2005 there were 24 teams (from 20 clubs) in total, with over 800 women taking part.

A U17 Youth Girls Competition was established by Football Victoria in 2004. This was following legal action taken against them in the Victorian Civil and Administrative Tribunal (following a complaint to the Equal Opportunity Commission) by Penny Cula-Reid, Emily Stayner, and Helen Taylor. The three schoolgirls were banned from playing in junior leagues, with fears of expensive insurance liability in case of injury and "medical reasons" being cited by Football Victoria (i.e. the physical differences between the bodies of boys and girls). The court found in favour of the girls in February 2004. In response to the ruling, the U17 Youth Girls Competition began in May, with 122 girls participating.

Victoria fields both senior and under 19 in the AFL Women's National championships and have been the dominant state, with the two teams combined having won every one of the 15 national titles.

Western Australia

Organised Women's Australian rules football has been played in Western Australia since 1988, with the first premiership being won by Mount Lawley. Although it has less clubs than Queensland, Western Australia is considered the strongest women's state outside of Victoria. The strongest clubs are in Perth.

South Australia

In 1990, a group of South Australian women helped instigate an exhibition match between a South Australian side and the Victorian Women's Football League. The success of the match saw the formation of the SAWFL for the next season. The clubs are centred in Adelaide.

New South Wales

The Sydney Women's AFL competition is the only organised women's football in New South Wales. It has been running since 2000 and has grown substantially in popularity. Centred on metropolitan Sydney it has two divisions and 12 clubs in 2013.
In 2015, the Black Diamond AFL commenced its inaugural women's competition in the Newcastle and Central Coast regions. Six clubs participated in the inaugural season (Maitland, Newcastle City, Nelson Bay, Warners Bay, Lake Macquarie and Wyong Lakes), with Newcastle City defeating Nelson Bay by 22 points in the Grand Final to claim the first BDAFL Women's premiership. The competition expanded to ten clubs in 2016 with teams from Singleton, Cardiff, Killarney Vale and Gosford entering teams. Nelson Bay avenged their 2015 heartbreak with an undefeated season culminating in a 3-point win over Newcastle City in the Grand Final. The competition continues to gain momentum with hopes of a second division being created in the near future.

Queensland

There are leagues centred in South-East Queensland and Central Queensland, and the cities of Cairns, Townsville, and Mackay.

Northern Territory

Australian Capital Territory

Tasmania
Tasmanian Women's Football League

Outside Australia

Africa
AFL South Africa runs a junior program which includes girls in mixed competition. There are plans for a junior girls' league in the North West Province.

Americas
Organised women's football is played in the United States (organised by the Women's Australian Football Association) and Canada (organised by the Canada Women's Australian Football League). The first match in the United States was played in Kansas City in October 2003. A women's division was introduced to the USAFL National Championships in 2005. Both the U.S. national team (known as the USA Freedom) and the Canadian national team (known as the Northern Lights) have played in the Australian Football International Cup. Outside of those countries, an under-19s championship with male and female divisions was held in Argentina in 2007.

Asia-Pacific
The Canterbury AFL in Christchurch played the first official women's football match in New Zealand late in 2006.

Also in 2006, AFL PNG (the sport's governing body in Papua New Guinea announced their first women's team (Under 16s) to take part in the Australian national women's tournament. It is estimated that there are around 200 women's Australian rules footballers in PNG.

In Japan, Australian rules football is played in many universities. Women's footy is played by the Tokyo Geckos, the Irish Galahs (Gaelic football) and Osaka Bilbies.

Europe
The first ever women's footy match in the UK was organised by Aussie Rules UK and was held in London on 21 April 2007 as part of the ANZAC Sports Challenge. Since then, women's Australian rules football teams have been formed across Europe, with women's teams representing England, Ireland, Scotland, France, Sweden, Croatia, and a combined Wales/Denmark team competing at the 2017 Australian Rules Football European championship, known as the Euro Cup. There is a women's league in London, founded in 2015, which currently consists of teams from 7 clubs across two divisions.

There are also University-based women's Australian rules football teams across Europe, such as at the Universities of Cork, Birmingham, Oxford, and Cambridge. The University of Oxford founded a women's team in 2015, with the University of Cambridge following in 2017. After more than 100 years since the first recorded men's Oxford versus Cambridge Australian rules football varsity match (as reported in the Kalgoorlie Miner newspaper in 1911) the first women's Australian rules varsity match was played in Oxford in March 2018 and resulted in a draw.

Notable Internationals
While there are an increasing number of professional and semi-professional players with multicultural backgrounds, increasingly players from outside of Australia are also finding pathways to semi-professional leagues. Like the AFL, this includes a large number of Irish converts from gaelic games such as Laura Duryea, Cora Staunton and Clara Fitzpatrick among others. However it also includes players from other countries (many with a rugby background) including New Zealand: Brooke Walker, Makaela Tuhakaraina, Lucy Single, Jesse Tawhiao-Wardlaw, Dee Heslop and Vaomua Laloifi; the United States: Danielle Marshall (USA); Canada: Kendra Heil and South Sudan: Akec Makur Chuot.

Of these, Laura Duryea and Clara Fitzpatrick (Ireland) and Kendra Heil (Canada) have represented their country at international level.

LGBTI issues
In September 2017 the AFL ruled that transgender woman, Hannah Mouncey, was ineligible for selection in the 2018 AFLW draft. There was opposition to the AFL's decision, and she can continue to play for her Canberra club.

See also 

 List of Australian rules football women's leagues
 List of International Australian rules football Tournaments
 AFL Women's National Championships
 International rules football
 Rec Footy
 9-a-side footy
 Touch Aussie Rules
 Kick-to-kick
 Australian rules football
 Metro Footy
 Women's sports

References

Bibliography

External links

 
Australian rules football
W